Adonis Hilario Vieria (born 1965 or 1966) is a retired Brazilian footballer who played as a striker and who played most of his career with Deportivo Saprissa of Costa Rica, during the 1980s and 1990s.

Club career
With Saprissa, he won three national championships, as well as one CONCACAF Champions Cup. He also played for Herediano and Guanacasteca, as well as Águila of El Salvador and several teams in Brazil. He also played a season for Tecos UAG in Mexico.

He was the top goal scorer in the 1991 Costa Rica's first division tournament, in which he scored 26 goals.

Retirement
After retiring in 1998, he began coaching in Saprissa's minor league system, where he still works.

References

Year of birth missing (living people)
Living people
Association football forwards
Brazilian footballers
Botafogo de Futebol e Regatas players
C.S. Herediano footballers
Deportivo Saprissa players
C.D. Olimpia players
C.D. Águila footballers
Deportivo Saprissa non-playing staff
Expatriate footballers in Costa Rica
Expatriate footballers in Honduras
Expatriate footballers in El Salvador
Expatriate footballers in Guatemala
1960s births